Gary Dolphin is an American sports broadcaster. He is the radio play-by-play broadcaster for the University of Iowa Hawkeyes football and men's basketball teams for Learfield/IMG College and the Iowa Hawkeye Sports Network. Learfield Sports represents over 130 colleges across 31 states. He has served in that role since December 1996.  Dolphin grew up in Cascade, Iowa, with a single mother, due to his father passing away.

Career 
Dolphin attended Loras College in Dubuque, Iowa and then enrolled at Brown Institute of Broadcasting in Minneapolis. Prior to getting the job from Learfield Sports as "The Voice of The Hawkeyes," Dolphin had various stops in both radio and television before landing a job calling Northwestern University men's basketball in 1990. In 1996, Dolphin was one of 63 applicants that applied for the University of Iowa job. After a successful interview, he was hired on December 13, 1996. For football broadcasts, he works alongside Ed Podolak. His broadcast partner for basketball is Bobby Hansen.

In 1999, Dolphin was a contender for the radio play-by-play job on Chicago Bears football broadcasts. The field was narrowed to Dolphin and Gary Bender and the Bears chose Bender. Just two years later, the Bears pursued Dolphin when Bender resigned citing exhaustion from the extensive travel required. Dolphin rejected the Bears' offer because it would have forced him to move to Chicago and cut his ties to the Hawkeyes' broadcasts.

In addition to calling games, Dolphin is the host of the weekly radio program Hawk Talk, where fans can call in to talk to Dolphin and Iowa coaches Kirk Ferentz and Fran McCaffery. He also hosts weekly television coaches shows, where Ferentz and McCaffery recap the latest games.

Dolphin was named "Iowa Sportscaster of the Year" by the National Sportscasters and Sportswriters Association in 2000 and 2010.

References

External links
 
 "One on One with Gary Dolphin"
 Gary Dolphin on 'Iowa Desk and Couch' with Alex Solsma

College basketball announcers in the United States
College football announcers
Iowa Hawkeyes football announcers
Living people
American sports announcers
People from Iowa
Year of birth missing (living people)